The 2008 European Fencing Championships were held  in Kyiv, Ukraine. The event took place from July 5 to July 10, 2008.

Medal summary

Men's events

Women's events

Medal table

Results

Men

Épée individual
7 July

Épée team
10 July

Foil individual
6 July

Foil team
9 July

Sabre individual
5 July

Sabre team
8 July

Women

Epée individual
6 July

Epée team
9 July

Foil individual
5 July

Foil team
8 July

Sabre individual
7 July

Sabre team
10 July

External links
Official website

European Fencing Championships
E
Fencing Championships
International sports competitions hosted by Ukraine
Sports competitions in Kyiv
2000s in Kyiv
Fencing competitions in Ukraine